Hein ten Hoff (19 November 1919 – 13 June 2003) was a German boxer and Präsident des Bundes Deutscher Berufsboxer (BDB). He was the son of a Dutch peasant, who left The Netherlands for Germany (Oldenburg Land) in the end of the 1930s, and became a German citizen.

Amateur career
As an amateur boxer, Hein ten Hoff had 185 wins, 78 by KO, for a total of 194 fights. He was thrice a German champion in the Heavyweight class (1940, 1941 and 1944 – he beat Herbert Runge), and won the gold medal at the 1942 European Amateur Boxing Championships in Breslau.

Professional career
After World War II, he was a professional boxer, from September 1945 until August 1955 (won 32 (KO 28), lost 7 (KO 3), drawn 4, for a total of 43 fights). The international boxing world referred to him as the "Gentleman of the Ring", "Künstler", or "Ästhet im Ring". He won the German BDB heavyweight title in 1946, then lost a ten-round decision to Jersey Joe Walcott, the upcoming World champion, at Mannheim 1950, and finally won the EBU (European) heavyweight title, defeating Jack Gardner at West Berlin 1951. 
He retired from professional boxing in 1955 after he was knocked out
by Ingemar Johansson, the upcoming World champion, in Gothenburg.

Notable bouts

References

External links

 
|-

1919 births
2003 deaths
Heavyweight boxers
European Boxing Union champions
German male boxers
People from Ammerland
German people of Dutch descent
Sportspeople from Lower Saxony